Out of Love  is an Indian series based on Doctor Foster by Mike Bartlett adapted by Hotstar for its label Hotstar Specials. It is directed by Tigmanshu Dhulia and Aijaz Khan starring Rasika Dugal and Purab Kohli in lead roles. It premiered on Hotstar from 22 November 2019. The series was renewed for a season 2 of which the first two of five episodes aired on 30 April 2021 with the final episode being aired on 21 May 2021.

Cast 
 Rasika Dugal as Dr. Meera Kapoor
 Purab Kohli as Akarsh Kapoor
 Soni Razdan as Mrs. Kapoor, Akarsh's mother
 Meenakshi Chaudhary as Alia Kapoor (née Kashyap)
 Aanjjan Srivastav as Dr. Pradhan
 Sanghmitra Hitaishi as Mandira Pillai
 Ekavali Khanna as Kalpana Kashyap
 Harsh Chhaya as Kartik Kashyap
 Kabeer Kachroo as Abhishek Kapoor (Abhi), Meera and Akarsh’s son
 Disha Thakur as Shalini
 Vishwas Kini as Rohan
 Eisha Chopra as Payal
 Suhaas Ahuja as Vidyut Mehra
 Himanshi Choudhry as Ritu Mehra
 Virhi Kodvara as Ahaana Kapoor, Alia and Akarsh's daughter

Premise 
Meera and Akarsh have been happily married until one day Meera finds a hair on Akarsh's scarf. Meera becomes obsessed with finding out who Akarsh's mistress is. She finally confides in a friend who asks her to behave normally around Akarsh but continues digging for evidence. The show traces how Meera discovers Akarsh's lies, his affair with a much younger woman Alia and how she navigates her marriage.

Production 
In October 2019, Variety reported that Hotstar would be adapting BBC Studios's critically acclaimed series Doctor Foster for Indian audiences in association with BBC Studios India with Tigmanshu Dhulia and Aijaz Khan helming the series. By early November 2019, Hotstar revealed Rasika Dugal and Purab Kohli as lead actors.

It was announced that the series will be coming back with a season 2. The trailer of season 2 was unveiled on 21 April 2021

Episodes

Release 
The series was launched on 22 November 2019 on Hotstar.

Promotion 
The first trailer of the series was released by Hotstar on 1 November 2019 across multiple platforms.

Reception 
The series garnered largely positive reviews.

Ruchi Kaushal of Hindustan Times praised the way the series adapted to the Indian setting despite being a remake and called it one of Dugal's best works till date with strong writing and backed by Tigamanshu Dhulia's direction.

On the other hand, the series was also described as a banal take on infidelity by some others.

References

External links
 
2019 Indian television series debuts
Doctor Foster
Hindi-language Disney+ Hotstar original programming
Hindi-language television shows
Indian drama television series
Indian legal television series
Indian television series based on British television series
Television series by BBC Studios
Television shows set in Mumbai